Potassium channel regulator, also known as KCNRG, is a protein which in humans is encoded by theKCNRG gene.

Function 

KCNRG is a soluble protein with characteristics suggesting it forms hetero-tetramers with voltage-gated K+ channels and inhibits their function.

Clinical significance 
KCNRG has been found to be predominantly expressed in lung tissue. Additionally, KCNRG transcripts are also found in liver and some other tissues, but in lower extent.
Researchers at Uppsala University have found that KCNRG is found in the lower lung and constitutes an autoantigen in a rare disorder named autoimmune polyendocrine syndrome type 1 (APS1). As a subset of patients with APS1 suffer from respiratory disease, an autoimmune reaction against KCNRG may explain the respiratory disease in these patients. KCNRG may also be connected to common nonfatal diseases like asthma and chronic bronchitis.

References

Further reading